This is the discography of the British singer Engelbert Humperdinck who made his professional debut in 1967.

Albums

Singles

Notes

References

External links 
 Official website
 http://tsort.info/music/uqyhuc.htm

Discographies of British artists
Pop music discographies